Crabbes Creek is a town located in north-eastern New South Wales, Australia, in the Tweed Shire.

Demographics 

In the 2016 census, Crabbes Creek recorded a population of 290 people, a decrease from the 294 people recorded in 2011. 48.8% of residents are female and 51.2% male.

The median age of the Crabbes Creek population was 48 years.

In Crabbes Creek 76.8% of people were born in Australia. The only other responses for country of birth were Germany 3.5%, England 2.5%, New Zealand 1.1% and Greece 1.1%.

In Crabbes Creek, 76.5% of people only spoke English at home. The only other responses for language spoken at home were German 3.0%, Spanish 1.0%, Italian 1.0% and Macedonian 1.0%.

References 

Suburbs of Tweed Heads, New South Wales
Towns in New South Wales